A series of campaigns were conducted between 1231 and 1270 by the Mongol Empire against the Goryeo dynasty of Korea. There were seven major campaigns at tremendous cost to civilian lives, the last campaign made Goryeo a vassal state of the Yuan dynasty for approximately 80 years. The Yuan dynasty would exact wealth and tributes from the Goryeo kings. Despite submission to the Yuan dynasty, internal struggles among Goryeo royalty and rebellions against Yuan rule would continue, the most famous being the Sambyeolcho Rebellion. A greater amount of "stubborn resistance" was put up by Korea and Song Dynasty towards the Mongol invasions than many others in Eurasia who were swiftly crushed by the Mongols at a lightning pace.

The initial campaigns

Fleeing from the Mongols, in 1216 the Khitans invaded Goryeo and defeated the Korean armies multiple times, even reaching the gates of the capital and raiding deep into the south, but were defeated by Korean General Kim Chwi-ryeo who pushed them back north to Pyongan, where the remaining Khitans were finished off by allied Mongol-Goryeo forces in 1219. These Khitans are possibly the origin of the Baekjeong.

Gojong of Goryeo (reigned 1213–1259) was the 23rd king of the Goryeo dynasty of Korea. In 1225, the Mongol Empire demanded tribute goods from Goryeo and the Mongol envoy Chu-ku-yu was killed. His death was used by the Mongols as a pretext to invade Goryeo.

First Mongol invasion of Korea (August 1231 – January 1232) 

In 1231, Ögedei Khan ordered the invasion of Korea. The experienced Mongol army was placed under the command of General Saritai (not to be confused with Sartaq, a later Mongol khan). The Mongol army crossed the Yalu river and quickly secured the surrender of the border town of Uiju. The Mongols were joined by Hong Bok-won, a traitor Goryeo general. Choe Woo mobilized as many soldiers as possible into an army consisting largely of infantry, where it fought the Mongols at both Anju and Kuju (modern-day Kusong). The Mongols took Anju; however, they were forced to retreat after the Siege of Kuju. Frustrated by siege warfare, Saritai instead used his armies' superior mobility to bypass the Goryeo army and succeeded in taking the capital at Gaesong. Elements of the Mongol army reached as far as Chungju in the central Korean peninsula; however, their advance was halted by a slave army led by Ji Gwang-su where his army fought to the death. Realizing that with the fall of the capital Goryeo was unable to resist the Mongol invaders, Goryeo sued for peace. However, Mongols demanded 10,000 otter skins, 20,000 horses, 10,000 bolts of silk, clothing for 1,000,000 soldiers and a large number of children and craftsmen who would become slaves and servants of the Mongol empire. General Saritai began withdrawing his main force to the north in the spring of 1232, leaving seventy-two Mongol administrative officials stationed in various cities in northwestern Goryeo to ensure that Goryeo kept his peace terms.

Second Mongol invasion of Korea (June 1232 – December 1232) 

In 1232, Choe Woo, the then military dictator of Goryeo, against the pleas of both King Gojong and many of his senior civil officials, ordered the Royal Court and most of Gaesong's population to be moved from Songdo to Ganghwa Island in the Bay of Gyeonggi, and started the construction of significant defenses to prepare for the Mongol threat. Choe Woo exploited the Mongols' primary weakness, fear of the sea. The government commandeered every available ship and barge to transport supplies and soldiers to Ganghwa Island. The evacuation was so sudden that King Kojong himself had to sleep in a local inn on the island. The government further ordered the common people to flee the countryside and take shelter in major cities, mountain citadels, or nearby offshore islands. Ganghwa Island itself was a strong defensive fortress. Smaller fortresses were built on the mainland side of the island and a double wall was also built across the ridges of Mt. Munsusan.

The Mongols protested the move and immediately launched a second attack. The Mongol army was led by a traitor from Pyongyang called Hong Bok-won and the Mongols occupied much of northern Korea. Although they reached parts of the southern peninsula as well, the Mongols failed to capture Ganghwa Island, which was only a few miles from shore, and were repelled in Gwangju. The Mongol general there, Saritai (撒禮塔), was killed by the monk Kim Yun-hu (김윤후) amidst strong civilian resistance at the Battle of Cheoin near Yongin, forcing the Mongols to withdraw again.

Third Mongol invasion of Korea and treaty (July 1235 – April 1239) 

In 1235, the Mongols began a campaign that ravaged parts of Gyeongsang and Jeolla Provinces. Civilian resistance was strong, and the Royal Court at Ganghwa attempted to strengthen its fortress. Goryeo won several victories but the Goryeo military and Righteous armies could not withstand the waves of invasions. After the Mongols were unable to take either Ganghwa Island or Goryeo's mainland mountain castles, the Mongols began to burn Goryeo farmland in an attempt to starve the populace. When some fortresses finally surrendered, the Mongols executed everyone who resisted them.

In 1238, Goryeo relented and sued for peace. The Mongols withdrew, in exchange for Goryeo's agreement to send the Royal Family as hostages. However, Goryeo sent an unrelated member of the Royal line. Incensed, the Mongols demanded to clear the seas of Korean ships, relocate the court to the mainland, the hand-over of anti-Mongol bureaucrats, and, again, the Royal family as hostages.  In response, Korea sent a distant princess and ten children of nobles.

Fourth Mongol invasion of Korea (July 1247 – March 1248) 

In 1247, the Mongols began the fourth campaign against Goryeo, again demanding the return of the capital to Songdo and the Royal Family as hostages. Güyük sent Amuqan to Korea and the Mongols camped near Yomju in July 1247. After the king Gojong of Goryeo refused to move his capital from Ganghwa island to Songdo, Amuqan's force pillaged the Korean Peninsula. With the death of Güyük Khan in 1248, however, the Mongols withdrew again. But the Mongol raids continued until 1250.

Fifth Mongol invasion of Korea (July 1253 – January 1254) 

Upon the 1251 ascension of Möngke Khan, the Mongols again repeated their demands. Möngke Khan sent envoys to Goryeo, announcing his coronation in October 1251. He also demanded the King Gojong be summoned before him in person and his headquarters be moved from Ganghwa Island to the Korean mainland. But the Goryeo court refused to send the king because the old king was unable to travel so far. Möngke again dispatched his envoys with specific tasks. The envoys were well received by the Goryeo officials but they also criticized them, saying their king did not follow his overlord Möngke's orders. Möngke ordered the prince Yeku to command the army against Korea. However, a Korean in the court of Möngke convinced them to begin their campaign in July 1253. Yeku, along with Amuqan, demanded the Goryeo court to surrender. The court refused but did not resist the Mongols and gathered the peasantry into the mountain fortresses and islands. Working together with the Goryeo commanders who had joined the Mongols, Jalairtai Qorchi ravaged Korea. When one of Yeku's envoys arrived, Gojong personally met him at his new palace in Sin Chuan-bug. Gojong finally agreed to move the capital back to the mainland, and sent his stepson Angyeong as a hostage. The Mongols agreed to a cease fire in January 1254.

Sixth Mongol invasion of Korea (July 1254 – December 1254) 

The Mongols later learned that top Goryeo officials remained on Ganghwa Island, and had punished those who negotiated with the Mongols. Between 1253 and 1258, the Mongols under Jalairtai launched four devastating invasions in the final successful campaign against Korea.

Möngke realized that the hostage was not the blood prince of the Goryeo Dynasty. So Möngke blamed the Goryeo court for deceiving him and killing the family of Lee Hyeong, who was a pro-Mongol Korean general. Möngke' commander Jalairtai devastated much of Goryeo and took 206,800 captives in 1254. Famine and despair forced peasants to surrender to the Mongols. They established a chiliarchy office at Yonghung with local officials.

Seventh Mongol invasion of Korea (September 1255 – June 1256) 

Ordering defectors to build ships, the Mongols began attacking the coastal islands from 1255 onward. In the Liaodong Peninsula, the Mongols eventually massed Korean defectors into a colony of 5,000 households.

Mongke Khan once again sent a large army along with Prince Yeongnyeong and Hong Bok-won, who had been taken hostage by Jalaltai as the captain, and gathered at Gapgot Daedan (甲串岸) and showed momentum to attack Ganghwa Island. However, Kim Sugang (金守剛), who had just gone to Mongolia, succeeded in persuading Mongke Khan, and the Mongols withdrew from Goryeo.

Eighth Mongol invasion of Korea (May 1257 – October 1257) 

In 1258, Goryeo's King Gojong and one of the retainers of the Choe clan, Kim Injoon, staged a counter-coup and assassinated the head of the Choe family, ending the rule of the Choe family which spanned six decades. Afterwards, the king sued for peace with the Mongols. When the Goryeo court sent the future king Wonjong as hostage to the Mongol court and promised to return to Kaegyong, the Mongols withdrew from Central Korea.

There were two parties within Goryeo: the literati party, which opposed the war with the Mongols, and the military junta—led by the Choe clan—which pressed for continuing the war. When the dictator Choe was murdered by the literati party, the peace treaty was concluded. The treaty permitted the maintenance of the sovereign power and traditional culture of Goryeo, implying that the Mongols gave up incorporating Goryeo under direct Mongolian control and were content to give Goryeo autonomy, but the king of Goryeo must marry a Mongolian princess and be subordinate to the Mongolian Khans.

Ninth Mongol invasion of Korea

Aftermath

Much of Goryeo was devastated after the decades of fighting. It was said that no wooden structures remained afterward in Goryeo. There was cultural destruction, and the nine-floor-tower of Hwangnyongsa and the first Tripitaka Koreana were destroyed. After seeing the Goryeo crown prince come to concede, Kublai Khan was jubilant and said "Goryeo is a country that long ago even Tang Taizong personally campaigned against but was unable to defeat, but now the crown prince comes to me, it is the will of heaven!"

Internal struggles within the royal court continued regarding the peace with the Mongols until 1270.

Since Choe Chung-heon, Goryeo had been a military dictatorship, ruled by the private army of the powerful Choe family. Some of these military officials formed the Sambyeolcho Rebellion (1270–1273) and resisted in the islands off the southern shore of the Korean peninsula.

Beginning with Wonjong, for approximately 80 years, Goryeo was a vassal state and compulsory ally of the Yuan dynasty. The Mongol and Korean rulers were also tied by marriages as some Mongol prince and aristocrats married Korean princesses and vice versa. During the reign of Kublai Khan, King Chungnyeol of Goryeo married one of Kublai's daughters. Later, a Korean princess called the Empress Gi became an empress through her marriage with Toghon Temür, and her son, Ayushiridara became an emperor of the Northern Yuan dynasty. The Kings of Goryeo held an important status like other important families of Mardin, Uyghurs and Mongols (Oirat, Hongirat, and Ikeres). It is claimed that one of Goryeo monarchs was the most beloved grandson of Kublai Khan and had grown up at the Yuan court.

The Mongol darughachis at the court of the Goryeo were offered provisions and sometimes were also willing to actively be involved in the affairs of the Goryeo court. Part of Jeju Island converted to a grazing area for the Mongol cavalry stationed there. Even today, there are several Mongolian words used in the Jeju Island. Furthermore, the Mongol domination of Eurasia encouraged cultural exchange, and this would include for example the transmission of some of the Korean ideas and technology to other areas under Mongol control.

The Goryeo dynasty survived under influence of the Yuan dynasty until it began to force Yuan garrisons back starting in the 1350s, when the Yuan dynasty was already beginning to crumble, suffering from massive rebellions in China. Taking advantage of the opportunity, the Goryeo king Gongmin also managed to regain some northern territories.

See also
History of Korea
Korea under Yuan rule
Sambyeolcho Rebellion
Mongol conquest of Eastern Xia
Han conquest of Gojoseon

References

External links 
 Korea Britannica article (in Korean)
 Sanderson Beck

 

13th century in China
Wars involving Goryeo
Korea
1230s in the Mongol Empire
1250s in the Mongol Empire
1230s conflicts
1250s conflicts
13th century in Korea